Ella Hendley Stevens (born December 11, 1997) is an American professional soccer player who plays as a midfielder for National Women's Soccer League (NWSL) club Chicago Red Stars.

Club career

Chicago Red Stars
Stevens made her NWSL debut in the 2020 NWSL Challenge Cup on July 1, 2020.

References

External links
 Duke profile

1997 births
Living people
People from Snellville, Georgia
Sportspeople from the Atlanta metropolitan area
Soccer players from Georgia (U.S. state)
American women's soccer players
Women's association football midfielders
Duke Blue Devils women's soccer players
Chicago Red Stars draft picks
Chicago Red Stars players
United States women's under-20 international soccer players
National Women's Soccer League players